Gary Kroeger (born April 13, 1957) is an American businessman, columnist, and actor best known for his work as a cast member on Saturday Night Live from 1982 to 1985, and his work on various game shows. He ran in the Democratic Congressional primary in 2016 and then for an Iowa state house seat in the 2016 election. Kroeger lost to incumbent Republican Walt Rogers by a 10,072 to 7,200 margin, 58% to 42%. Kroeger now stars in a television show called "The Gary and Kenny Show" co-starring his best friend Ken Ceizler. Less known celebrity Adam "Fletch" Kidd produces and edits the show.

Background and Personal Information 
Gary Kroeger was born in Cedar Falls, Iowa. Kroeger attended Northern University High School and graduated from Northwestern University in 1981. He was married to Leigh Kroeger from 1997-2007, with whom he shares two sons, Christopher and Alexander. Kroeger married Shannon Alexander, a user experience designer from Massachusetts in 2017.

Saturday Night Live
He joined the cast of Saturday Night Live during Lorne Michaels's hiatus from the show, under the direction of Dick Ebersol. During his tenure, Kroeger, who also wrote for the show, was frequently cast as young teenage kids and impersonated Walter Mondale when he was the Democratic candidate for US President in 1984. He is probably best remembered today for a Christmas sketch in which he and fellow cast member Julia Louis-Dreyfus perform "Blue Christmas" as Donny and Marie Osmond. The sketch culminates with the supposed brother and sister making out with each other.

Later acting career
Kroeger left the show in 1985 when Michaels returned to the show and the entire cast was replaced. Since then he has kept a fairly low profile, appearing in only a handful of movies, including roles as a producer in Christopher Guest's 1989 Hollywood send-up The Big Picture; as Reggie Mantle in 1990's Archie: To Riverdale and Back Again; and in the lead and title role in the spoof film A Man Called Sarge. Kroeger played a major role in the Murder She Wrote episode "The Grand Old Lady" as brainiac Christopher “Christy” McGinn, who ultimately solves the mystery.

He has enjoyed some success as a host of television game shows, most notably revivals of The Newlywed Game and Beat the Clock. He was also the announcer for the 2001 revival of Card Sharks and the 2002 revival of Press Your Luck called Whammy! The All-New Press Your Luck. He hosted a revival of the game show Beat the Clock in 2002 on PAX TV. In addition, he appeared on the sitcom Hidden Hills and as a weatherman in an episode of HBO's Curb Your Enthusiasm. From 1990 to 1991, he was host of Fox's Comic Strip Live.

Kroeger also made a guest appearance in the episode Columbo: Death Hits the Jackpot (1991), as the murder victim. In 2000, he hosted an infomercial for DirecTV, which played in-store at many Best Buy locations. In 2002, he hosted the 26th annual Mrs. America Pageant.

Kroeger is also a "veteran performer" with the Cedar Falls Community Theatre. Some of his more recent appearances include their June 2021 production of Mamma Mia! in which he played the role of Sam Carmichael and their June 2022 production of The Fantasticks in which he played the role of El Gallo.

Business career
Kroeger gave up ownership of the restaurant Figaro Figaro in Simi Valley, California in 2003, but reopened in Cedar Falls, Iowa, in 2017. The restaurant closed in 2019.
He has relocated to his hometown in Iowa and can still be seen in local theater, as well as the occasional infomercial. Kroeger is a weekly columnist for the Waterloo Cedar Falls Courier and also writes a blog, "Gary Has Issues".

, Kroeger is creative director for Cedar Falls, Iowa-based Mudd Advertising and well as CEO of a consulting firm, Outlier Creative Solutions.

Political campaign
He announced his candidacy for the U.S. House of Representatives from Iowa's 1st congressional district on April 6, 2015, but announced on March 2, 2016, that he was dropping his bid in order to run for the Iowa House of Representatives.

References

External links
"Gary Has Issues" website

"Columnists of the Waterloo Cedar Falls Courier" website

1957 births
20th-century American male actors
21st-century American businesspeople
21st-century American male actors
American advertising people
American columnists
American game show hosts
American sketch comedians
American restaurateurs
Businesspeople from Iowa
Candidates in the 2016 United States elections
Game show announcers
Iowa Democrats
Living people
Male actors from Iowa
Northwestern University School of Communication alumni
People from Cedar Falls, Iowa